Csaba Czakó (born 6 April 1943) is a Hungarian rower.

Czakó was born in Budapest in 1943. At the 1967 European Rowing Championships, he competed in the coxless four and his team won silver. He competed at the 1972 Summer Olympics in Munich with the men's coxless four where they were eliminated in the heats.

References

1943 births
Living people
Hungarian male rowers
Olympic rowers of Hungary
Rowers at the 1972 Summer Olympics
Rowers from Budapest
European Rowing Championships medalists